Siah Choqa (also Romanized as Sīāh Choqā, Seyah Cheqā, and Sīāh Cheqā) is a village in Kamazan-e Olya Rural District, Zand District, Malayer County, Hamadan Province, Iran. At the 2006 census, its population was 117, in 28 families.

References 

Populated places in Malayer County